Columbia Generating Station is a nuclear commercial energy facility located on the Hanford Site,  north of Richland, Washington. It is owned and operated by Energy Northwest, a Washington state, not-for-profit joint operating agency. Licensed by the Nuclear Regulatory Commission in 1983, Columbia first produced electricity in May 1984, and entered commercial operation in December 1984.

Columbia produces 1,207 megawatts net of electricity, which is about 10 percent of the electricity generated in Washington state.

Design and function 
Columbia Generating Station is a BWR-5. It features a Mark II containment structure.

The reactor core holds up to 764 fuel assemblies, and 185 control rods, more technically known as control blades.  The reactor is licensed for a power output of 3486 thermal megawatts
(MWt). The gross electrical output of the plant is 1230 megawatts-electric(MWe).

The Columbia Generating Station features six low-profile fan-driven cooling towers.  Each tower cascades clean warmed water, a byproduct of water heat exchanging with steam after leaving a turbine, down itself and subsequently cools the warmed water via a combination of evaporation and heat exchange with the surrounding air.  Some water droplets fall back to earth in the process, thereby creating a hoar frost in the winter. At times, the vapor cloud from the cooling towers can reach  in height and can be seen at a great distance. Replacement water for the evaporated water is drawn from the nearby Columbia River.

History
Columbia was built by the former Washington Public Power Supply System, known since 1998 as Energy Northwest. Its construction permit was issued in March 1973, and construction began in late 1975 on the Hanford Site. Because of cost overruns and construction delays, the plant did not begin commercial operation until December 1984. Of the five commercial reactors originally planned by the Bonneville Power Administration and the Supply System in Washington, Columbia was the only one completed. The nuclear power plant was also known as Hanford Two, with Hanford One being the 800 MWe power generating plant connected to the N-Reactor (decommissioned in 1987), a dual purpose reactor operated by the  Atomic Energy Commission: producing plutonium for the nuclear weapons stockpile, as well as generating electricity for the grid. 

When the Supply System changed its name to Energy Northwest, the plant's name went from WNP-2 (Washington Public Power Supply System Nuclear Project number 2) to Columbia Generating Station. In 2000, then-Executive Board Chairman Rudi Bertschi said the plant's former name referred "to an earlier era when the Washington Public Power Supply System was building five nuclear power plants. Those days are long gone," said Bertschi. "Our plant has made the transition, as has Energy Northwest, from being a marginal producer to being a key cog in the region's energy machine."

Extensive maintenance was completed during the planned refueling outage starting in early April 2011, including the replacement of the original condenser. At the time, the refueling outage marked the end of a record-setting 486 days of continuous operations. The outage was planned for 80 days finishing in July; however, work was not completed until that September. The total cost of repairs and refueling was $170 million. Replacing the condenser allowed for better plant efficiency thus producing more electricity in the future, helping offset the cost of the project.  

Columbia's original NRC license to operate was scheduled to expire in December 2023. In January 2010, Energy Northwest filed an application with the Nuclear Regulatory Commission for a 20-year license renewal – through 2043. In May 2012, the NRC approved the 20-year license renewal.

In 2012, Energy Northwest entered into agreements with the Tennessee Valley Authority, the U.S. Enrichment Corporation (Centrus Energy) and the Department of Energy to turn depleted uranium (also called uranium tails) into low-cost enriched uranium product for further future processing into nuclear fuel. Buying under market value at a set price to obtain a nine-year fuel supply, the transaction is estimated to bring between $171 and $275 million in savings to the region through 2028.

Economics 
In late 2012, the Bonneville Power Administration and Energy Northwest came together to analyze the financial value of Columbia in light of low energy prices in the wholesale electricity market and historic low fuel costs for natural gas-fired power plants. The agencies studied three scenarios and concluded, in April 2013, that Columbia's continued operation was the most cost-effective option for consumers.

In April 2013, Energy Northwest commissioned a third-party study by IHS Cambridge Energy Research Associates, a firm with a 75-year reputation for independent expertise in the fields of energy, economics, market conditions and business risk. IHS CERA came to the same conclusion as the April 2013 joint BPA-EN study.

In 2013, the Columbia Generating Station set a record for electricity generation during a refueling outage year – 8.4 million megawatt hours of electricity sent to the regional power grid. In 2012 – a non-refueling outage year – Columbia generated a record 9.3 million megawatt hours of electricity for the regional power grid (95% capacity factor).

In January 2014, the Public Power Council, representing Northwest consumer-owned utilities, examined the competing market assessments and said they found no compelling evidence that ceasing operation of Columbia is economically advisable for the region. The PPC assessment supported public statements by BPA affirming Columbia's provision of unique, firm, baseload, non-carbon emitting generation with predictable costs for the region's ratepayers.

The Public Power Council observed in February 2014 that the variable cost of Columbia operations in recent years were slightly above spot market energy prices. However, the council stated that a single unanticipated shift in the markets "can easily wipe out years of anticipated benefits" gained from replacement power.

The council referenced the Western Energy Crisis of 2000-2001. During that relatively short energy crisis, according to the council, the cost benefit of Columbia's power "dwarf[ed] the modest benefits that would have been achieved" through replacement power. "In 2001 alone the operation of Columbia Generating Station compared to the market saved Bonneville Power Administration ratepayers $1.4 billion," according to the council.

Electricity Production

Spent fuel
Columbia Generating Station's spent fuel pool is able to accommodate 2,658 fuel assemblies.  It was designed as a short-term storage option until a national repository could be built.  Since there is no projected start date for the stalled national long-term nuclear waste storage facility at Yucca Mountain Repository in Nevada, the station obtained approval for dry cask storage to avoid exceeding the pool's licensed capacity.  The Columbia Generating Station has an on-site  installation, which allows for storage of spent fuel rods in specially designed and manufactured casks. As of 2021, 45 casks have been loaded and stored in the installation, making room in the spent fuel pool.

Surrounding population

The 2010 population within  of Columbia was 10,055, an increase of 10.4 percent in a decade. The 2010 population within  was 445,416, an increase of 23.4 percent since 2000. Cities within 50 miles include Richland ( to city center) and Pasco ( to city center).

Potential risks
The Nuclear Regulatory Commission's estimate of the risk each year of an earthquake intense enough to cause core damage to the reactor at Columbia was 1 in 47,619, according to an NRC study published in August 2010.  The Department of Energy is planning a new earthquake assessment that will update the last comprehensive one conducted in 1996.  The U.S. Geological Survey has shown that the active faults of the Puget Sound Region are connected to ridges in the Mid-Columbia by faults that cross the Cascades (see ).

According to the U.S. Nuclear Regulatory Commission, the Columbia Generating Station site is a "Dry Site" since the plant is above the Design Basis Flood Line.

See also

List of nuclear reactors
WNP-1 and WNP-4
WNP-3 and WNP-5

Notes

References

External links
Official plant website

Columbia River
Hanford Site
Nuclear power plants in Washington (state)
Nuclear power stations using boiling water reactors
Buildings and structures in Benton County, Washington
Energy infrastructure completed in 1984
1984 establishments in Washington (state)